Decibel Festival was an annual music and digital arts festival in Seattle, launched in 2004 by Sean Horton and a team of volunteer staff. The Decibel Festival was dedicated to live electronic music performance, visual arts, and new media.

History
The festival consisted of concerts, performances, commissioned work, film screenings, and exhibitions. The programming was presented in a variety of locations throughout Seattle, including the Capitol Hill neighbourhood and Downtown Seattle. In addition to the performance programs, the Decibel Festival included a professional section featuring panels, lectures, and workshops, which served as a meeting ground for leading-edge artists, labels, and music gear manufacturers.

In fall 2011, the Decibel Festival celebrated its largest edition to date, with 23,000 attendees. The 2011 edition sold both record numbers of festival passes (up 18% from 2010) and individual showcase tickets (up 45% from 2010). 

Despite years of stated intent to publications, attendees, supporters, artists, and volunteer staff to become a non-profit organisation, it never materialised.

After a festival high in 2011, the Decibel Festival would come to an end in 2015. Horton moved to Los Angeles. Horton continues to use the Decibel Festival name to promote smaller events, which are mainly hosted in Los Angeles.

Artists 

Since its inception, Decibel has hosted over 1,100 acts ranging from underground dance and experimental electronic music to transmedial art. Some of these past performers include:

3 Channels
12th Planet
Addison Groove
Akufen
The Album Leaf
Alexi Delano
Alter Ego
Amon Tobin ISAM LIVE
Apparat
AraabMuzik
Atom™
Autechre
Baths
Ben Klock
Ben Frost
Biosphere
Bok Bok
Bonobo
Booka Shade
Boys Noize
Breakage
Bruno Pronsato
Carl Craig
Caspa
Catz 'n Dogz
Charli XCX
Christopher Willits
Claude VonStroke
Cobblestone Jazz
Dabrye
Daedelus
Dan Bell
DARKSIDE
Deadbeat
Deadmau5
The Dead Texan
Derrick May
Dinky
Diplo
DJ Krush
dOP
Duke Dumont
Egyptrixx
Empire of the Sun
Erykah Badu
Ellen Allien
Eluvium
FaltyDL
fennesz
The Field
Flying Lotus
Flume
Four Tet
Frank Bretschneider
Frivolous
Funkstörung
The Gaslamp Killer
Geographer
Girl Unit
The Glitch Mob
Gold Panda
Green Velvet
Gui Boratto
Harold Budd
ill-esha
Isolee
Itak Tek
Jacob London
James Blake
Jeff Samuel
John Tejada
Joker
Justice
Kangding Ray
Kevin Saunderson
KiloWatts
Kimbra
Ladytron
Lorde
Loscil
Lusine
Machinedrum
Mad Professor
Mala
Marcus Nikolai
Marcel Dettmann
Martin Buttrich
Mary Anne Hobbs
Matias Aguayo
Matmos
Matthew Dear
Max Cooper
Meat Beat Manifesto
Michael Mayer
Moby
Mochipet
Moderat
Modeselektor
Monolake
Mount Kimbie
Mountains
Move D
Mt. Eden
Murcof
Nicolas Jaar
Nils Frahm
Nina Kraviz
Nortec Collective
Odesza
The Orb
Orbital
Pepe Bradock
Quantic
Ramadanman
Richie Hawtin
Robert Babicz
Robert Hood
Robin Guthrie
Sascha Funke
School of Seven Bells
Scott Pagano
Scuba
Shackleton
The Sight Below
Simian Mobile Disco
Smash TV
Soul Clap
Spacetime Continuum
Speedy J
Star Slinger
Starkey
Stars of the Lid
Strategy
Styrofoam
Subtle
Switch
T.Raumschmiere
Telefon Tel Aviv
Theo Parrish
Thievery Corporation 
Thomas Fehlmann
Tiger & Woods
Tim Exile
Tim Hecker
Tipper
Trentemoller
TOKiMONSTA
Tycho
VibeSquad
Vladislav Delay
Voodeux
Wighnomy Brothers
Wolf + Lamb
Zedd
Zola Jesus
Zomby

Venues 

Over the years, the Decibel Festival has been hosted at various venues across the Seattle area including: The Showbox, The Showbox SoDo, Q Nightclub, Neumos, The Crocodile, Illsley Ball Nordstrom Recital Hall, The Triple Door, Islander Cruise Ship, EMP Museum, and Re-Bar.

The Decibel Festival was a member of ICAS (International Cities of Advanced Sound).

See also

List of electronic music festivals

References

External links

 Decibel Festival
 Decibel Facebook Page
 Decibel Twitter Page
 Decibel YouTube Page

Music festivals established in 2004
Music of Seattle
Festivals in Seattle
Electronic music festivals in the United States
New media art festivals
Fairs in Washington (state)